The Siege of Siracena was a Bosporan siege led by Satyrus II and Meniscus on the fortified capital city of the Siraces, Siracena, that occurred in 309 BC during the First Bosporan Civil War. The Siraces were a hellenized Sarmatian tribe that had sided with Eumelos, a claimant to the Bosporan throne and a brother of Satyrus.

Prelude
Before the siege, the Bosporan army which had been composed of 34,000 troops (20,000 Scythian Infantry, 10,000 Scythian cavalry, 2,000 Thracians peltasts and 2,000 Greek mercenaries hoplites) had successfully defeated and routed Aripharnes and Eumelos, and the Siracen army of 42,000 (22,000 Infantry, 20,000 cavalry) during the Battle of the River Thatis.

Satyros gave immediate chase to his younger brother, where he came up the Siracen capital city of Siracena which was heavily fortified and situated on that the river Thatis. Knowing that he could not take the city, he plundered the surrounding countryside and took on many prisoners.

Siege
Satyros II had his men cut through the trees that surrounded the easiest entry way of the city for a total of 4 days, although on the third day, they began to experience missile fire and arrows from the Siracens on the city's walls, they could not fight back as the woods were too thick and could not see who was firing at them, or from where. On the fourth day, they were able to reach the wall and enter the city. As soon as he made it through, Meniscus fought with great valor and boldness against his enemies, but had to retreat once a larger force of Siracens had arrived at his location. Seeing his friend in danger, Satyrus rushed to his aid and fought valiantly, but was struck with a spear to his right shoulder and he was carried to camp. Satyrus died that night, and Meniscus gave up the siege and took his body back to Panticapaeum.

Aftermath
Meniscus returned the body of his friend Satyros to his younger brother Prytanis, who then assumed the title of basileios and continued his brother's war against his other brother Eumelos. Prytanis would later be spared, to only be later killed after his attempt to usurp his brother Eumelos and he would become ruler of the Bosporan Kingdom and expand its fame and naval power in the Black Sea.

References

309 BC
Wars of the Bosporan Kingdom
300s BC conflicts
Battles involving the Scythians